Robert Arthur Jones (20 November 1849 – 23 May 1925) was born in Liverpool but moved to Southend-on-Sea after working for a clock and watchmaker in Manchester. In 1890 he set up his jewellery business on Southend's High Street. He went on to become one of the most important benefactors of the town.

Business career
R A Jones' shop was situated at 76–78 High Street, Southend. An image of the shop, taken c.1914, is preserved in the Essex Record Office.

An archive of papers, receipts and photographs relating to the business of R A Jones is cared for at the Central Museum, Southend.

After R A Jones died in 1925, the High Street business was continued by his son, Edward Cecil. It suffered severe damage during World War Two when, in October 1942, the area was hit by a Messerschmitt attack.

The store finally closed in 1979, when it was replaced by a Lavells newsagents, which in turn was replaced by Dixons (another firm started in Southend). The building is still prominent in Southend High Street, currently hosting Yours ladyswear, with its large clock and the name R.A.Jones moulded into the fascia.

Personal life

Philanthropy
In 1913, R A Jones presented the Jones Memorial Ground to the school children of the town of Southend in memory of his wife. It had cost him £9000.

Priory Park in Prittlewell was donated to the town by R A Jones: in 1917 he purchased Prittlewell Priory from the Scratton family, along with 22 acres of land. Having negotiated the purchase of a further six acres, R A Jones then presented the site stating, "I think it is a sin for a man to die rich, it is a great privilege to me to be able to do this, for I believe strongly in facilities for recreation.  There will now be no need for such an out of the way and costly park as Belfairs.  Prittlewell, with its historic and old-world associations, its beautiful trees and lakes, and its nearness to the centre of town, is an ideal place.  Part of the building would be suitable for a museum, and there would also be refreshment room accommodation, while the grounds would provide facilities for cricket, football, tennis, hockey and other sports.  I propose that the name of the park should be Priory Park".

Victory Sports Ground was given to Southend by R A Jones in 1921, and it particularly commemorates those sportsmen who died in World War One. This public park was given for the benefit of the people of Southend, and is managed in Trust by Southend-on-Sea Borough Council.

A public drinking fountain, commemorating the fallen of World War One and given by R A Jones, is sited in Priory Park.

The clock at the entrance to Prittlewell Square was donated by R A Jones.

He endowed the R A Jones in Memoriam Fund which exists to promote the education of children attending primary schools in Southend-on-Sea.

Additional photographs

External links
Southend Museums Service
Picture of Store Front & Clock by PaddyB - https://www.flickr.com/photos/45898619@N08/8131291448/
Pictures of R A Jones in Evening Echo - http://www.echo-news.co.uk/news/14517898.PICTURES_FROM_THE_PAST__The_historic_Southend_High_Street_clock_through_the_years/#
 https://www.justgiving.com/crowdfunding/Projectticktock  This funding is to restore the R A Jones Clock in Southend High Street

References

Southend-on-Sea (town)
1849 births
1925 deaths
English jewellers
Buildings and structures in Southend-on-Sea